"Let's Stop Talkin' About It" is a song written by Deborah Allen, Rafe Van Hoy and Rory Bourke, and originally recorded by Allen in 1982.  In January 1984, American country music artist Janie Fricke released the song as the second single from her album Love Lies.  The song was Fricke's fifth number one country hit as a solo artist.  The single went to number one for one week and spent a total of twelve weeks in the country top 40.

Charts

Weekly charts

Year-end charts

References

1984 singles
Deborah Allen songs
Janie Fricke songs
Songs written by Rory Bourke
Songs written by Deborah Allen
Song recordings produced by Bob Montgomery (songwriter)
Columbia Records singles
Songs written by Rafe Van Hoy
1982 songs